Badminton railway station is a closed railway station in Gloucestershire, England on the line between Wootton Bassett to the east, and Patchway and Filton to the west. It served the villages of Badminton and Acton Turville.

The station was opened by the Great Western Railway in 1903 and became part of British Railways on 1 January 1948. The station was closed in 1968.

The station buildings and sections of platforms still stand derelict with trains passing through the site on the South Wales Main Line.

Further reading

External links
Badminton on navigable 1946 O. S. map
Badminton on Geograph
The local M.P. raises the closure in Parliament – May 1968

Former Great Western Railway stations
Disused railway stations in Bristol, Bath and South Gloucestershire
Railway stations in Great Britain opened in 1903
Railway stations in Great Britain closed in 1968